The Miss Utah competition is the pageant that selects the representative for the state of Utah in the Miss America pageant. Two Miss Utah titleholders have won the Miss America pageant.

Lindsey Larsen of Lehi was crowned Miss Utah 2021 on June 11, 2022 at the Capital Theatre in Salt Lake City, Utah. She competed for the title of Miss America 2023 at the Mohegan Sun in Uncasville, Connecticut in December 2022 where she was a Non-finalist Talent winner.

Gallery of past titleholders

Results summary
The following is a visual summary of the past results of Miss Utah titleholders at the national Miss America pageants/competitions. The year in parentheses indicates the year of the national competition during which a placement and/or award was garnered, not the year attached to the contestant's state title.

Placements
 Miss Americas: Colleen Kay Hutchins (1952), Sharlene Wells (1985)
 2nd runners-up: Muriel La Von Goodspeed (1938), Carolyn DeAnn Lasater (1962)
 4th runners-up: Armelia Carol Ohmart (1946)
 Top 10: Janet Carolyn Secor (1959), Marian Faye Walker (1961), Frances Yvonne Vernon (1966), Jonelle Smith (1982), Jaclyn Hunt (2002), Katie Millar (2007), Sasha Sloan (2021)
 Top 15: Marilyn Robinson (1948), Christina Lowe (2011)
 Top 16: Jill Stevens (2008), Kara Arnold (2013)

Awards

Preliminary awards
 Preliminary Lifestyle and Fitness: Sharlene Wells (1985), Elizabeth Anne Johnson (1992), Amy Davis (2005), Julia Bachison (2006), Danica Olsen (2012)
 Preliminary Talent:  Muriel La Von Goodspeed (1938), Marilyn Robinson (1948), Colleen Kay Hutchins (1952), Marian Faye Walker (1961), Carolyn DeAnn Lasater (1962), Sophia Symko (1989), Amanda Moody (1996), JessiKate Riley (2018)

Non-finalist awards
 Non-finalist Talent: Suzanne Storrs Poulton (1956), Francine Louise Felt (1958), Sally Peterson (1973), Brenda Richardson (1974), Lynn Lambert (1984), Sophia Symko (1989), Jacque Dawn Tingey (1990), Jennifer Nakken (1991), Jennifer Ward (1993), Amanda Moody (1996), Mary McDonough (1998), Michele Mobley (1999), Vanessa Ballam (2000), Jami Leilani Palmer (2001), Stacy Johnson (2004), Kayla Barclay (2009), JessiKate Riley (2018), Jesse Craig (2019), Lindsey Larsen (2023)

Other awards
 Miss Congeniality: Sally Peterson (1973), Ciera Pekarcik (2014)
 America's Choice: Jill Stevens (2008)
 Bernie Wayne Talent Scholarship: Amanda Moody (1996)
 Charles & Teresa Brown Award: Krissia Beatty (2015)
Equity and Justice Winner: Sasha Sloan (2022)
Jean Bartel Social Impact Initiative 1st runner-up: Sasha Sloan (2022)
 Miss Photogenic: Amy Davis (2005)
 Quality of Life Award Winners: Jaclyn Hunt (2002)
 Quality of Life Award 2nd runners-up: Mary McDonough (1998)
 Quality of Life Award/Social Impact Initiative Scholarship Finalists: Dexonna Talbot (2020)
Women in Business Finalist: Sasha Sloan (2022)

Winners

 Marie Windsor - "unofficial" 1939 winner

References

External links
 Miss Utah official website
 G.I. Jill Stevens Site - Miss Utah 2007

Utah
Utah culture
Women in Utah
1926 establishments in Utah
Annual events in Utah
Recurring events established in 1926